Gwegyi may refer to several places:

Gwegyi (25°'14"N 95°58"E), Homalin Township, Sagaing Region
Gwegyi (24°45"N 95°'3"E), Homalin Township, Sagaing Region
Gwegyi, Indaw, Indaw Township, Sagaing Region